Billy Lavern Smith (born September 13, 1954) is a former Major League Baseball pitcher who appeared in ten games with the Houston Astros in .

Smith was drafted by the Astros in the fourteenth round of the 1977 Major League Baseball draft. Over four seasons in their farm system, he was primarily a starting pitcher, however, when he played his one season in the majors, he was used primarily in relief.

He made his major league debut on June 9 against the Philadelphia Phillies, just before the player strike interrupted the season. He allowed two earned runs in two innings pitched, including a solo home run to Bob Boone.

In the second half of the season, he emerged as one of the stars of Houston's bullpen that helped them capture the second half crown. On August 12, he earned his only career save against the San Francisco Giants. On August 29, he made his only career start, and pitched seven scoreless innings against the Phillies for his only career win. Overall, he was 1-1 with a 2.41 earned run average in nine games over the second half of the season. In the 1981 National League Division Series, he faced one batter, Dusty Baker, and got him to ground out.

References

External links

1954 births
Living people
Houston Astros players
Major League Baseball pitchers
Baseball players from Texas
Sam Houston Bearkats baseball players
People from La Marque, Texas
Wharton County Pioneers baseball players
Cocoa Astros players
Columbus Astros players
Daytona Beach Astros players
Gulf Coast Astros players
Tecolotes de Nuevo Laredo players
Tucson Toros players
American expatriate baseball players in Mexico